Ayush Mehra is an Indian actor who primarily works in Hindi films and web shows. He made his debut in the film Isi Life Mein...! (2010) and his television debut in Love By Chance (2014). He made his web debut with Mom and Co and hosted Myntra Fashion Superstar, both in 2019.

Mehra went onto establish himself with successful web shows including Minus One, Please Find Attached and Operation MBBS and the television show Life Lafde Aur Bandiyan.

Personal life
Since 2006, Mehra is in a relationship with Aashna Vijay.

Career

Debut and early career (2010-2018) 
Mehra made his acting debut in 2010 with the Hindi film Isi Life Mein...! portraying Sunil. He then portrayed Raj in the 2012 Hindi film Bittoo Boss.

He made his television debut in 2014 with Love By Chance portraying Dhruv opposite Shivangi Joshi. In 2015, he appeared in the final episode of the show, portraying Onil Chakravarty opposite Priya Chauhan.

In 2015 and 2016, he portrayed Aditya and Aarav in Yeh Hai Aashiqui respectively, both opposite Shrishti Ganguly Rindani. The same year, he portrayed Rishabh Bhalla in his first fiction show Life Lafde Aur Bandiyan.

Breakthrough and success (2019-2021) 
The year 2019 proved as a major turning point in his career. He first worked as an assistant director in Uri: The Surgical Strike. He then made his web debut with Mom and Co portraying Aditya Joshi alongside Neelima Azeem.

Mehra appeared in other web shows the same year including, Love On The Rocks portraying Nikhil and When You Meet Your Ex portraying Karan opposite Shreya Gupto. He also hosted Myntra Fashion Superstar.

Since 2019, Mehra is seen portraying Varun in Minus One opposite Aisha Ahmed and is seen portraying Shaurya Singh in Please Find Attached opposite Barkha Singh.

In 2020, he portrayed Dhruv Singh in the short film Phone Call. From 2020 to 2021, he portrayed Nishant Singh in Operation MBBS alongside Anshul Chauhan and Sarah Hashmi.

In 2021, he appeared in Call My Agent: Bollywood portraying Mehershad. He was also seen in Life Love Siyaapa portraying Rishab opposite Shanice Shrestha.

Recent work (2022-present) 
In 2022, Mehra portrayed Akash in the reel series How To Fall In Love opposite Tanya Maniktala. He then portrayed Pranav in the short film Recommended For You.

Mehra will next make his film debut with Kacchey Limbu opposite Radhika Madan. The film premiered at the 47th Toronto International Film Festival.

He will also appear in the second season of Minus One.

Filmography

Films

Television

Web series

Awards and nominations

References

External links

Indian web series actors
Year of birth missing (living people)
Living people